The Haitian Football Federation (FHF) is the governing body for football in Haiti. The FHF is responsible for overseeing all aspects of the game of football in Haiti, both professional and amateur. A member of CONCACAF since 1961, FHF is in charge of football in Haiti and all lower categories. The principal sporting field is the Sylvio Cator stadium in Port-au-Prince. It is a founding member of CONCACAF.

Federal Council

Staff

 Men's Coach:  Jean-Jacques Pierre
 Men's Assistant Coach:  Pierre Roland Saint-Jean 
 Women's Coach:  Laurent Molter
 Women's Director:  Shek Borkowski 
 Women's Assistant Coach:  Christian Castro 
 U20 Coach:  Manuel Rodriguez Navarro 
 U17 Coach:  Chery Pierre 
 U17 Coach: Gabriel Michel 
 U15 Coach:  Julio Cesar Alvarez Perez 
 Fitness:  Gregorio B. Modesto Gomez 
 Academy:  Gregorio B. Modesto Gomez

2010 earthquake 

The federation, which had struggled financially for years, lost all but two of its more than 30 officials during the 2010 earthquake. Also because of the earthquake, the national stadium's field, as well as many other stadiums, were converted to be used as housing for survivors and refugees in makeshift tents. Due to the financial and personal losses of the federation, large financial sums were donated by FIFA and globally–high-ranking individuals within the sport, as well as a $3 million fund for rebuilding infrastructure that had been created by FIFA.

Camp Nous 

Camp Nous is the Haitian Football Federation operated training centre and academy for Haitian football players in Croix-des-Bouquets. It was inaugurated in May 2012.

See also 

 Haiti national football team
 Haiti women's national football team
 Haiti national under-23 football team
 Haiti national under-20 football team
 Haiti national under-17 football team
 Haiti national under-15 football team
 Ligue Haïtienne
 Coupe d'Haïti

References

External links 
 Haiti at the FIFA website
 Haiti at CONCACAF website
 Fédération Haïtienne de Football 

Haiti
Association football governing bodies in the Caribbean
 
Football
Sports organizations established in 1904
1904 establishments in Haiti
Sports academies